Thin Ice is a 2013 documentary film following geologist Simon Lamb on a search to understand the science behind climate change.  This is achieved by traveling the world and meeting a range of scientists, from biologists to physicists, who are investigating the climate. The film's conclusion emphasises the scientific consensus on human-induced climate change.

The film was a joint initiative between Oxford University and Victoria University of Wellington, and premiered around the world on Earth Day 2012, and in New Zealand in 2015.

References

External links
Thin Ice official website, from where the film can be viewed and a DVD purchased.
Official trailer

Documentary films about global warming
2013 films
2013 documentary films
Culture of the University of Oxford
Victoria University of Wellington